The ABC Trial was a United Kingdom trial conducted in the 1970s, of three men for offences under Section 2 (wrongful communication of information) and (as dropped during the trial) of one of these men, a scholarly journalist, for an offence under Section 1 (imparting information which might be useful to an enemy for a purpose prejudicial to the safety or interests of the state) of the Official Secrets Act 1911. The men were two libertarian journalists of a similar political viewpoint as much of the Labour government, and a resigned GCHQ source seeking to heighten scrutiny of government-authorised wire-tapping and limit the work of the American espionage agency, the CIA, in Britain. These aims were furthered in the following two decades achieved through detailed parliamentary scrutiny into and regular reports as to the work of security services, a Freedom of Information Committee and regulation of wire-tapping. Aside from very limited reportage from the Central Criminal Court, its early analysis comes in the account of one of its investigative-journalist defendants, Duncan Campbell, in the annual journal Socialist Register.

Background
London magazine Time Out in 1976, through the writings of the first and third defendants, published a two-page account of GCHQ called "The Wiretappers", this was among other evidence collected and imparted by the defendants as to how GCHQ operates from year-to-year including gathered evidence, such as photographs of radio masts, of its physical apparatus.

By statute, the Attorney General needed to condone the prosecution for it to proceed; he did so.

The case took place from September to November 1978 – still in an era of vital surveillance to counter ongoing threats due to the Cold War and from Irish and Northern Irish dissident republicans. Conviction of some form was assured as all parties could not deny a small amount of classified information had been communicated and no tenable argument of the law as to freedom of information such as on the basis of freedom of expression was raised.

The Watergate scandal in the US, exposed by investigative journalists, showed the effectiveness of press reporting of the activities of secret government agencies. President Nixon had repeatedly claimed that the requirements of national security overrode the public's right to know, and this had been exposed by the press, Senate and Congress, to have been driven by his desire to cover up criminal activity.

Summary
The trial was held in Court 1 of the Central Criminal Court. It was against the defendants: Crispin Aubrey, John Berry and Duncan Campbell; Campbell also being subject for cuttings and photographs gathered to a Section 1 charge, dropped before the close of the trial, the judge stating they were "oppressive in the circumstances". Aubrey was a journalist for Time Out, John Berry was a former Corporal in signals intelligence (SIGINT), and Duncan Campbell was an investigative journalist.

One of the prosecution witnesses was an anonymous SIGINT (that is, electronic communications) officer, referred to as Colonel B. Campbell's 1979 account identified him as Colonel Johnstone.

The trial found that the information came almost entirely from open publications, some from the USA.

The jury confirmed guilt (convicted) as to the remaining (non-dropped) Section 2 offence as to disclosure of those classified matters in no way in the public domain. The only penalty imposed was against Berry and was non-custodial; but criminal records of all three would hamper certain sensitive employment. In 1979 Campbell wrote an article, including the words "It ended in convictions under Section 2 for each of us, but with negligible penalty – in the case of myself and fellow journalist Aubrey, no penalty at all.". This added "'Colonel B' rapidly achieved the position of a national figure of ridicule.".  In Campbell's view many editorials mentioning the unnecessarily secretive governance of and occasionally counter-productive application of protected status to essentially all information at and concerning GCHQ largely fuelled the decision by the Liberal Party, successful in the random selection of private member's Bills via Clement Freud, to select a Freedom of Information Bill. The bill, a forerunner of the Freedom of Information Act 2000, lapsed with the end of the Callaghan ministry but achieved a wholly unopposed second Commons reading, reflecting a sea change among those dominant legislative members (British MPs).

The Section 1 charge "lacked the legitimation which could be provided by the existence of a subversive or hostile threat, the presentation of their evidence rapidly became ridiculous. The information [Campbell] had gathered, dealt with piecemeal, was of course readily available in public. As witness after witness conceded this point, the prosecution rapidly lost any sense of purpose." The prosecution dropped this charge.

The contemporary drive of most of the security services with making themselves and their nature top secret, already widely suspected, was criticised in the centrist, libertarian 1979 article by Campbell, citing in support Tony Bunyan's 1976 book The Political Police in Britain, which opined that Official Secrets Acts, as then applied and interpreted in the courts, "represent the last resort in suppressing public knowledge of the workings of the state".

The quickly rubbished first jury, its foreman and others having been in service with the Government, leading to an unchallenged second jury who heard and decided the case, was directly responsible for exposing extreme jury vetting, and eliciting official disclosures on the  nature and previous extent of the practice - generally in the case of political or terrorist trials, or cases of organized crime. Increasing attention by libertarians to the nature of the jury system, and its preservation and strengthening, proved to be a lasting bonus of the case.

The case indirectly raised questions of or helped to shape principles of UK law.

Timeline
18 February 1977: Aubrey and Campbell (the two journalists) interviewed Berry
20 February 1977: All three men were arrested and charged under Section 2 of the Official Secrets Act 1911 (Berry was charged with "communicating classified information to unauthorised persons", and Campbell and Aubrey with "unauthorised receipt of classified information")
24 May 1977: Further charges were added under Section 1 of the Official Secrets Act
9 August 1977: Additional charge under Section 1 against Duncan Campbell, for collecting information
November 1977: Committal hearing at Tottenham Magistrates Court. First appearance of Colonel B as a prosecution witness.
5 September 1978: Trial opened at the Old Bailey before Mr Justice Willis
18 September 1978: Trial stopped after jury foreman was exposed as a former SAS officer
3 October 1978: Second trial opened before Mr Justice Mars-Jones
24 October 1978: All Section 1 charges were dropped
14 November 1978: Aubrey and Berry were convicted by the jury
16 November 1978: Campbell was convicted by the jury
17 November 1978: The only penalty imposed was non-custodial, against Berry.

Defendant's opinion of Attorney General
In 1979, Campbell wrote that the Attorney General "had allowed himself to be used as a patsy for the security services to try to rearrange the law of official secrecy to their choosing. Several initiatives from that quarter had become apparent during the case."

References

Aldrich, Richard J. GCHQ: The Uncensored Story of Britain's Most Secret Intelligence Agency, Harper Press 2010.
Aubrey, Crispin (1981). Who's Watching You? Britain's Security Services & the Official Secrets Act (1st ed.). Penguin Books. .
Robertson, Geoffrey (1999). The Justice Game, Vintage Books.

External links 
 The ABC Trial via archive.org http://ukcoldwar.simplenet.com/nuclear/civildefence/abctrial/
 GCHQ and me - my life unmasking British Eavesdroppers; Duncan Campbell, August 3, 2015

1970s in London
1978 in case law
1978 in England
1978 in British law
English criminal case law
GCHQ
Trials in England